Lykoudis is a Greek surname, derived from the Greek word for wolf (lykos).

Notable people with this surname include:

 Georgios Lykoudis (born 1964), Greek volleyball player
 John Lykoudis (1910-1980), Greek doctor
 Spyros Lykoudis (born 1945), Greek politician
 Stylianos Lykoudis (1878-1958), Greek admiral

Likoudis
This surname can also be transliterated Likoudis, especially outside of Greek speaking countries.
 James Likoudis (born ?), Catholic author

See also
 Lykoudi, Greek village